Pseudogobius is a genus of fish in the goby family, Gobiidae. It is widely distributed in tropical and temperate regions of the Indian and western Pacific Oceans. Species occur in freshwater and estuarine habitat types, such as mangroves and seagrass beds.

Species
There are currently 8 recognized species in this genus:
 Pseudogobius avicennia Herre, 1940
 Pseudogobius fulvicaudus S. P. Huang, K. T. Shao & I. S. Chen, 2014
 Pseudogobius javanicus Bleeker, 1856
 Pseudogobius masago Tomiyama, 1936
 Pseudogobius melanostictus F. Day, 1876
 Pseudogobius olorum Sauvage, 1880 (Bluespot goby) 
 Pseudogobius poicilosoma Bleeker, 1849 (Northern fatnose goby)
 Pseudogobius taijiangensis I. S. Chen S. P. Huang & K. Y. Huang, 2014

References

Gobionellinae
Taxa named by Canna Maria Louise Popta
Ray-finned fish genera